Mushegh III Mamikonian (Armenian: Մուշեղ Գ Մամիկոնյան) was an Armenian sparapet that fought against the Arabs during the Muslim conquest of Persia. He was killed during the Battle of al-Qādisiyyah in 636.

Family

The family of Mushegh III Mamikonian is disputed. The Armenian historian Sebeos calls him a son of Davith Mamikonian. According to Christian Settipani, Davith was probably the son of Hamazasp, who was the son of Mushegh II Mamikonian. However, Cyril Toumanoff considers Davith as the son of Vahan II. Historians, however, agree that Mushegh was the elder brother of Hamazasp IV and Grigor I Mamikonian, who were both princes of Armenia.

Death

In 636, Mushegh III, at the head of an army of 3000 men, and Novirak Grigor II, prince of Siunia, at the head of 1000 men, were the Armenian contingent who joined the army Rostam Farrokhzad, the spahbed of the Sasanian forces, who was preparing to fight the Muslim Arabs who were camping at Qādisiyyah.

Mushegh III, along with his two nephews, his sister's son, and his son Grigor II, died during the battle, including the Sasanian general Rostam Farrokhzad and a large part of the Sasanian army.

Children

According to Cyril Toumanoff, and some other historians, Mushegh had a son named Mushegh IV Mamikonian, who was also a sparapet and prince of Armenia.

See also
 Mamikonian
 Persian Armenia

References

Sources

Further reading 
  Continuité des élites à Byzance durant les siècles obscurs. Les princes caucasiens et l'Empire du VIe au IXe siècle, 2006
  Les dynasties de la Caucasie chrétienne de l’Antiquité jusqu’au XIXe siècle ; Tables généalogiques et chronologiques, Rome, 1990.

Sparapets
Ancient Armenian generals
Generals of Yazdegerd III
Year of birth unknown
636 deaths
Military personnel killed in action
7th-century Armenian people
Mushegh 03
Armenian people from the Sasanian Empire